The  is a museum in Higashimurayama, Tokyo, Japan that is dedicated to education about Hansen's disease (leprosy) and to eliminate discriminatory practices against its sufferers. It was formerly (1993–2007) named "His Imperial Highness Prince Takamatsu Memorial Museum of Hansen's Disease".

The museum's purpose, located next to one of Japan's remaining leprosy sanatoriums, is to:

 To promote awareness of leprosy
 To represent and preserve the history of leprosy in Japan
 To show what persons affected by leprosy have achieved
 To help restore the dignity of persons affected by leprosy
 To demonstrate the importance of human rights and the linked need to end prejudice and discrimination

History
Fujio Ohtani wrote in a pamphlet "H.I.H. Prince Takamatsu Memorial Museum of Hansen's Disease": Our Museum was conceived as a commemorative undertaking for the Fortieth Anniversary of the Tofu Kyokai Foundation. While the construction plans were under way, the Leprosy Prevention Law still existed. All the parties involved ardently wished that this new Museum would function in a way to win the public support for abolition of the Law and to show the realities of the thirteen national and three religious associations affiliated Hansen's Disease sanatoria, which were known only to a limited number of people.

Table
June 25, 1993  H.I.H. Prince Takamatsu Memorial Museum of Hansen's disease opened.
March, 2004  The master plan of the renewed museum was completed.
October, 2004  The 10th year memorial book was published.
September, 2005  The museum was transiently closed.
March, 2007, The renewed National Museum of Hansen's Diseae opened.

On Display
Demonstrations based on the first pamphlet.

The Meiji Era and Taisho Era
Photograph of Dr. Hansen, Early leprosaria, Okamura who produced splendid chaoulmoogra oil and saved patients.
Isolation strengthened.

Showa Era
Injection of Promin, Struggle against the law.

Law was abolished, Trial for compensation
Photographs of patients' struggles.

Life in Sanatoriums
Photographs of hospitalization, Special money used only in sanatoriums.
Treatment;Bandages, Injections of choaulmoogra oil, Labor assigned to patients.

Maintenance of Order
Recreations, prisons.

Marriage, Abortions and Sterilization
Marriage was permitted on the condition of sterilization.

Education in Sanatoriums
Education was unsatisfactory. Schools were built within the sanatoriums and at the start, teachers with leprosy taught pupils.

Prejudice in Society (Leprosy Stigma)
Complete destruction of Sotojima Hoyoen by typhoon, Fujimoto Incident, Tatsuda Children's Home Incident.

Death in Sanatoriums
Funerals are important ceremonies. Every sanatorium has chapels, temples, a mortuary, a crematory, a charnel house, since the bones of patients had been usually rejected by their families. Traditionally each religious group performed funeral services for its members.

How to create something to live for
Music, literature, and others are their pleasures in life.

Progress of Medicine
Medical aspects of leprosy are shown, such as multidrug Therapy(MDT) and rehabilitation.

Sanatoriums in and out of Japan
photographs of sanatoriums in Japan as well as out of Japan.

Testimony of ex-patients and related persons
Video testimony of 42 persons of ex-patients and some doctors.

Information about the Museum
Open: 9.30-16.30(admission 9.30-16.00)
Closed: on Mondays
Admission fee: free
Address: 4-1-13, Aobacho, Higashimurayama-shi, Tokyo 189-0002
Access: from Kiyose Station (Seibu-Ikebukuro line), 10 minutes by bus
from Shin-akitsu Station (Higashinihontetudo), 10 minutes by bus
Neighboring Sanatorium: National Tama-zenshoen Sanatorium
Neighboring Leprosy Institute: Hansen's Disease Institute

See also
Leprosy
Leprosy in Japan
Kensuke Mitsuda
Leprosy stigma
Hannah Riddell
Matsuki Miyazaki

Notes

External links

 Ex-Hansen's disease patients still struggling with prejudice (retrieved August 1, 2009)
 Museum website (in Japanese)

Leprosy in Japan
Museums in Tokyo
Science museums in Japan
Medical museums in Japan
Higashimurayama, Tokyo
1993 establishments in Japan
Museums established in 1993